Bill White was the President of the Intrepid Sea-Air-Space Museum and Intrepid Fallen Heroes Fund.

White was born in the late 1960s, is a native of Point Lookout, New York, and graduated Fordham University. White worked in his family's business and began to work for Intrepid in 1992 and became chief of staff to Zachary Fisher and fundraiser for the Intrepid Museum Foundation. In 1996 he was awarded the Meritorious Public Service Award for his work for the United States Navy. He resides in Manhattan.

In 2008, White was mentioned as a possible nominee for United States Secretary of the Navy for the Obama administration. His nomination was supported by Hugh Shelton, a former Chairman of the Joint Chiefs of Staff, and Jerrold Nadler, in whose congressional district the Intrepid Museum is located. The post eventually went to former Mississippi governor and ambassador to Saudi Arabia, Ray Mabus.

In June 2009, The Washington Times reported White to be considered for Deputy Chief Management Officer for the United States Department of Defense, which would make him the highest-ranking openly gay person in the department.

In 2010, Bill White founded Constellations Group, a strategic consulting firm that advises corporations, foundations, and high-net-worth individuals with their business challenges and philanthropic endeavors. The firms' mission is to support the men and women of the US armed forces and first responder communities and their families.

Bill White resigned from his position as President of the Intrepid museum and other Intrepid related positions in May 2010 in order to pursue new challenges with similar goals. The museum gave no explanations for White's abrupt resignation. White had been subpoenaed earlier by the office of then New York State Attorney-General Andrew Cuomo in connection with investigations into campaign fundraising solicitations from pension fund managers. He had been connected to former state comptroller Alan G. Hevesi who resigned after pleading guilty to a felony charge.

In September 2010, Bill White agreed to pay a $1,000,000 fine to settle charges that he was involved in the state pension fund pay to play scandal.

On February 1, 2011 Bill White was voted back onto the Board of Trustees of the Intrepid Fallen Heroes Fund

On May 14, 2012 it was reported by CNN  that in a letter obtained by CNN Bill White had withdrawn his support from Republican presidential candidate Mitt Romney over his stance on gay marriage days after President Obama had stated his full support for gay marriage. In his letter, Bill White requests that Romney's campaign return his maximum contribution. White stated to CNN that while he does not support President Obama's fiscal policy, he supports him over Romney because he believed Romney would push for a constitutional amendment against gay marriage that would nullify his own marriage.

Personal life

White married his husband Bryan Eure in 2011, with prominent lawyer David Boies officiating. In attendance were Barbara Walters, David A. Patterson, Gayle King, and Joel Grey, among many other high-profile individuals. Aretha Franklin was the wedding singer.

Bill splits his time between Atlanta, GA and New York City.

In 2012, White purchased a townhouse in Manhattan at 460 West 22nd Street for $4.6 million and subsequently flipped it for $16 million after extensive renovations. The renovated property had been visited by Barack Obama, Jennifer Lopez and Mark Wahlberg before it was bought by DRGB Y Asociados LLC.

2014 Fundraiser with President Obama 

On October 7, 2014, President Obama attended a $25,000 a seat fundraiser hosted in the home of Bryan Eure and Bill White, the former president of the Intrepid Sea, Air and Space Museum and the chairman of the Constellations Group. Money was raised for Democratic candidates in the midterm elections. In attendance were;  Rosie O’Donnell, Aretha Franklin and Mark Wahlberg.

Support for President Trump after 2016 Presidential Election

After President Trump's election in 2016, Bill White and his husband Bryan Eure, switched their political and donor activity to conservative causes, abandoning their previous support for Hillary Clinton and Barack Obama. White and Eure hosted a $5 million fundraiser for President Trump in 2018. After the 2020 Presidential election, White helped raise funds for the payment of fees incurred by President Trump's legal team in challenging the election results.

References

External links
Constellations Group biography

Directors of museums in the United States
Fordham University alumni
LGBT people from New York (state)
1960s births
Living people
Year of birth uncertain
People from Point Lookout, New York
21st-century American LGBT people